Bathycrinus gracilis is a species of sea lily, a crinoid in the family Bathycrinidae. It is native to the North Atlantic. It was described  by Charles Wyville Thomson.

Distribution

References 

Bourgueticrinida
Animals described in 1877